Giulio Antonio Santorio (6 June 1532 – 9 May 1602) was an Italian Cardinal of the Roman Catholic Church.

Biography
Santorio was born in Caserta.  He served as Archbishop of Santa Severina from 1566 until his death.

On 12 March 1566, Santorio was consecrated bishop by Scipione Rebiba with Annibale Caracciolo, Bishop of Isola, and Giacomo de' Giacomelli, Bishop Emeritus of Belcastro, serving as co-consecrators. Santorio was made Cardinal on 17 May 1570, and installed as the Cardinal-Priest of S. Bartolomeo all'Isola the same year, and subsequently became  Cardinal-Priest of S. Maria in Trastevere in 1595 and  finally in 1597 Cardinal-Bishop of Palestrina. Through his own episcopal consecration of Girolamo Bernerio, Cardinal Santorio figures in the episcopal lineage of Pope Francis, Pope Benedict XVI, and most modern bishops.

Episcopal succession

Literary works
Vita del card. Giulio Antonio Santori detto il card. di Santa Severina composta e scritta da lui medesimo, in «Archivio della R. Società di Storia Patria», voll. XII 1889 e XIII 1890
Pro confutatione articulorum et haeresum recentiorum Haereticorum et pseudo-apostolorum, ex Utriusque Testamenti textu decerpta, in ms. Vaticanus Latinus 12233, cc. 62r-439v, Biblioteca Apostolica Vaticana
Historia abiuratorum et haereticorum scripta et notata a Cardinali Sanctae Severinae ... De persecutionis haereticae pravitatis historia, ms. in Archivio della Congragazione per la Dottrina della Fede

References

Further reading
 L. Santori, La spedizione di Lautrec nel Regno di Napoli, Galatina 1972
 R. Ajello, Una società anomala. Il programma e la sconfitta della nobiltà napoletana in due memoriali cinquecenteschi, Napoli 1996
 S. Ricci, Il Sommo Inquisitore. Giulio Antonio Santori tra autobiografia e storia (1532–1602), Roma 2002 

1532 births
1602 deaths
17th-century Italian cardinals
Cardinal-bishops of Palestrina
Cardinals created by Pope Pius V
People from Caserta
Major Penitentiaries of the Apostolic Penitentiary
16th-century Italian Roman Catholic archbishops
Roman Catholic archbishops in Italy
Bishops in Calabria
16th-century Italian cardinals